Addlestone & Weybridge Town F.C. was a football club in Addlestone, England which extended its name from Addlestone F.C. in 1980. The club's senior team reached the quarter-finals of the FA Vase twice and the first round of the FA Cup once, where they came back from 0–2 down at Brentford to force a 2–2 draw. They lost the replay 0–2.  In 1985, the club ceased due to lack of money and the greater success of rival clubs. The last match took place against Waterlooville at home on 27 April 1985. The team played in an all red kit.

History
Addlestone F.C. was formed in April 1885 by Thomas Weeding and Frederick Darling, local football enthusiasts and played their games at Crockford Park. In early 1892 the club was suspended by the Surrey FA for spectator hooliganism. In season 1892–93 the club won the Surrey Village Competition. In 1895 the club had grown large enough to enter the North West Surrey League and with it entry into the Surrey Senior Cup where they were outclassed 9–0 by shorter-lived Weybridge F.C.. The best finish for the club in this league was third in season 1904–05.  The year 1906 saw a mass walkout of the committee and an acute financial crisis almost ending the club — it disbanded for a short period of time. It reformed for season 1908–09 and joined Division Two of the Surrey Junior League.

After the First World War the club joined the Surrey Intermediate League. In 1922 the club finished runners up to Chertsey Town and appeared in the Surrey Senior Cup final the year after. That success encouraged the club to move into the Surrey Senior League for the 1924–25 season. For the first time the club entered the FA Amateur Cup, losing to local rivals Egham Town and the FA Cup, defeating Weybridge in their first match 4–0 but losing the next 6–1 to Thornycroft Athletic. A bottom-of-the-table finish in 1931 forced the club to rejoin the Surrey Intermediate League.

Shortly after the end of World War II the club rejoined the Surrey Senior League.  In the early 1950s the club was offered, freehold, an orchard in Liberty Lane, completed with the help of a loan from the FA, and remained there until the club folded in 1985. In 1954–55 the club entered the Parthenon League achieving a mid-table finish. Added travelling proved too much for many players so the club went back to the Surrey Senior League two seasons later. In 1959–60 the team finished runners-up to Chertsey Town.  The season after, the club won the title, this time with one point more than Croydon Amateurs and Chertsey Town as well as winning the Surrey Charity Cup.

In 1964–65 the club joined the larger Spartan League with a respectable showing. In the next season re-election was narrowly avoided and the club lost 0–9 to Woking in the FA Cup.  The club were 1969–70 runners-up to Hampton but won the league cup against them at Egham. The wide Athenian League admitted the club in 1971 and divisional promotion was won three years later. The same season saw Addlestone beat Woking in the final of the Southern Combination Cup. The club finished third in the first season in the higher division and retained the Southern Combination Cup beating Egham Town 2–1. The club reached the quarter finals of the FA Vase for the second season in a row, a feat never to be repeated.  In 1977 the club was refused entry into the enlarging Isthmian League and so joined the Southern League for season 1977–78. Seasons of mid-season poor results saw, in 1980–81, a new management team and a change of name to Addlestone & Weybridge Town FC. The first round proper of the FA Cup was reached. Despite being drawn to be at home the club decided to switch their first leg with Brentford to Griffin Park seeing a 2–2 draw result but the losing the replay 2–0.

The following season the club reached the fourth qualifying round and finished 9th in the league thus entering the newly formed Southern League Premier Division. They were bottom and relegated that next season but finished fifth in the Southern Division the season after. The sale of the ground led to a mid-season crisis within the club and the decision was taken to end its association with the town of Addlestone and move to pastures new. The club reached the final of the Surrey Senior Cup for the first time however lost 0–2 to Sutton United.

See also
Abbey Rangers F.C., Addlestone Moor (1976-date)

Bibliography
Official match programme for the last AWTFC game – Sat 27 April 1985

References

External links

Defunct football clubs in England
Association football clubs established in 1885
Association football clubs disestablished in 1985
1885 establishments in England
1985 disestablishments in England
Surrey County Intermediate League (Western)
Parthenon League
Spartan League
Athenian League
Southern Football League clubs
Defunct football clubs in Surrey